Lifehouse International Church is a Pentecostal church part of the Australian Christian Churches and ARC Churches, mainly in Asia.

It has churches located in Tokyo, Tachikawa, Yokohama, Atsugi, Yokosuka, Osaka, Kobe, Sendai, Sapporo Fukuoka, Hiroshima, Bali, Hong Kong, Taipei, Honolulu, and more

The Churches senior pastors, Rod and Viv Plummer, began the church in 2002 in Tokyo  with a team of 10 Australians and one Japanese couple.

The Church's latest album "No Limit" reached number 1 in the iTunes "Gospel" category in Japan.

History
The church was founded in 2002 by Rod Plummer and his wife Viv in Tokyo, Japan, with a team of 16 people.  

The church was originally named Jesus Lifehouse simplified to Lifehouse as they started to plant Churches in other countries.

Lifehouse Tokyo has seen consistent growth every year growing from the initial team of 16 people to over 2,500 in 2020.

Churches 
Lifehouse has planted 19+ Churches in Japan and other countries in Asia.

Tokyo 

Lifehouse International Church Tokyo was started in 2002 with a team of 16 people.  It now has over 1500 people attending regularly. It is pastored by Rod and Viv Plummer.

Tachikawa 
Lifehouse International Church Tachikawa was planted in 2015.

Yokohama

In 2010 the Tokyo church started Lifehouse International Church Yokohama with young leaders and a small team of young people. 

Lifehouse Yokohama has bilingual English and Japanese services with pop-style praise and worship using Lifehouse original songs. Lifehouse Yokohama has a church service every Sunday at 11am and 2pm.

The service has a range of internationals and Japanese from kids to university students through to families, reflecting the demographic of Yokohama. It is now seeing over 300 people attending services and events regularly, with over 15 countries represented.

Atsugi
Lifehouse International Church Atsugi was planted in 2015.

Yokosuka
Lifehouse International Church Yokosuka was planted in 2015.

Osaka
In 2008 the Tokyo church planted their second church, Lifehouse Osaka, with a small team originally from the Tokyo church and Australia.
The church is pastored by Lewis and Ayami Rice under the leadership of Rod and Viv Plummer. Now seeing over 350 people
in services weekly.. In 2013, Lifehouse Osaka launched the Kobe location.

Kobe 
Lifehouse International Church Kobe was planted in 2013.

Fukuoka 
Lifehouse International Church Fukuoka was planted in 2014.

Sendai 
Lifehouse International Church Sendai was planted in 2012 in response to the Great Tohoku earthquake and tsunami.

Sapporo 
Lifehouse International Church Sapporo was planted in 2011 with leaders from the Tokyo church and a small team of young people from Australia.

Hiroshima 
Lifehouse International Church Hiroshima had their first Sunday meeting on November 22, 2015, and started regular services in early 2016.

Nagoya 
Lifehouse International Church Nagoya had their first Sunday meeting in 2019.

Hong Kong

Lifehouse International Church Tokyo adopted a small church in Hong Kong in 2009, which then became Lifehouse International Church Hong Kong. In June 2011, Richard Welsh moved from Tokyo to Hong Kong to pastor the church under the leadership of Rod and Viv Plummer.

The church has bilingual] services in English and Cantonese and weekly online services.

Taipei
Lifehouse Taipei is an international congregation with bilingual services in English and Mandarin.

Lifehouse Kids is a children's program that is run during the Sunday morning service. Child-minding facilities are also available during the 3PM service, for those parents who wish to attend a Connect Group.

Bali
In 2011 Lifehouse adopted a small church in Bali which has now become Lifehouse Bali. The church has service in Bahasa Indonesia.

Beliefs
Lifehouse is affiliated with the Australian Christian Churches, which belongs to the Pentecostal tradition of Christianity.

Music
Lifehouse Church uses primarily original songs in their services, which is translated and sung bilingually in English and Japanese.

They have released several albums of bilingual worship music in recent years, which are available on iTunes, Google Play, and Spotify.

Albums include In Your Name, Forward, King of Kings and Celebrate

Conferences
Lifehouse church holds a conference annually.

Lifehouse Conference
The Lifehouse conference is each year and is designed to promote the cause of the local church in Japan and across the world.  The conference is attended by up to 3000 people from various countries.

Tohoku Homestay Relief Program
In 2011 Lifehouse Church initiated a free homestay program. Tōhoku Relief HomeStay is a Relief Program administered by LifeHouse International Church together with support and partnership from Air New Zealand, Qantas as well as partner Churches and HomeStay partners in New Zealand & Australia. for school and university students affected by the 2011 Tohoku earthquake and tsunami.

210 students were sent to America, Australia and New Zealand during August and September to stay with host families and attend English schools free of charge.

Lifehouse Church worked with many partners to organize the program including American Airlines, Qantas, Air New Zealand, All Nippon Airways, Time Out New Zealand, Berlitz Language, ACC International Relief, TAFE NSW, the New Zealand Embassy and local churches throughout Australia, New Zealand and America.

References

External links

 Lifehouse International Church website

Australian Christian Churches
Churches in Tokyo
Christian evangelical denominations in Japan
Pentecostal denominations